These are the official results of the Men's 400 metres Hurdles event at the 1997 IAAF World Championships in Athens, Greece. There were a total number of 51 participating athletes, with seven qualifying heats, three semi-finals and the final held on Monday 4 August 1997.

Final

Semi-finals
Held on Sunday 1997-08-03

Qualifying heats
Held on Saturday 1997-08-02

See also
 1994 Men's European Championships 400m Hurdles (Helsinki)
 1995 Men's World Championships 400m Hurdles (Gothenburg)
 1996 Men's Olympic 400m Hurdles (Atlanta)
 1998 Men's European Championships 400m Hurdles (Budapest)
 1999 Men's World Championships 400m Hurdles (Seville)
 2000 Men's Olympic 400m Hurdles (Sydney)

References
 Results

H
400 metres hurdles at the World Athletics Championships